Awayan is a village near Belthra Road Railway Station in Ballia District, in the Indian state of Uttar Pradesh. District Ballia, U.P, India (Formerly in District of Azam Garh UP). The population was 5,604 at the 2011 Indian Census.

References
Here a group is active that name is helping hands groups. Group's aim is to save nature ,help everyone ,help children for their future etc.we want your love and blessings.

Villages in Ballia district